Hero of Kosovo is an official order in Kosovo.  It is awarded by the President of Kosovo.

Award

"Hero of Kosovo" is a state decoration given to historical figures of Kosovo starting from the League of Prizren and beyond, as well as citizens of Kosovo who have contributed to freedom and independence. The medal includes the portrait of Skanderbeg. It is crafted in gold.

It is awarded by the President of Kosovo, though the nomination might also come from: Chairman of the Assembly, Prime Minister, President of the Supreme Court and the Electoral College, Chief Prosecutor of Kosovo, Minister, Chief of General Staff, General Director of Police, President of the Municipal Assembly, and President of the Academy of Sciences and Arts.

Recipients 

 Bekim Berisha
 Isa Boletini
 Adem Demaçi
 Bahri Fazliu
 Ahmet Haxhiu
 Adem Jashari
 Hamëz Jashari
 Zahir Pajaziti
 Shaban Polluzha
 Agim Ramadani
 Ibrahim Rugova
 Selman Kadria
 Sali Çekaj
 Idriz Seferi
 Ismet Jashari
 Njazi Azemi

See also
Outline of Kosovo
List of awards for contributions to society
State decorations
Politics of Kosovo

Annotations

References:

Orders, decorations, and medals of Kosovo
Awards for contributions to society